Employed to Serve is a British heavy metal band from Woking, England.

History 
Employed to Serve was formed in 2011 by current members Justine Jones and Sammy Urwin. In July 2020, several members of Employed to Serve and Renounced released an EP as the side project Glorious.

Their album Conquering was elected by Loudwire as the 41st best rock/metal album of 2021. The track "Exist" was elected by the same publication as the 6th best metal song of the same year.

Musical style 
The group's sound has been described as a mixture of death metal, hardcore punk, post-hardcore and metalcore, among other genres. The band cited Machine Head, Testament and Exodus as influences on Conquering, their latest full-length release.

Members 
Justine Jones – vocals
Sammy Urwin – guitar/vocals
David Porter – guitar
Nathan Pryor – bass
Casey McHale – drums

Discography

Studio albums

Extended plays

References

External links 
 Official Facebook
 Official Twitter

Spinefarm Records artists